Baba Yaga is against! (Russian:Баба-яга против!) is a 1979 Soviet three-part hand-drawn cartoon, released by the state-owned Soyuzmultfilm studio for the 1980 Summer Olympics.

Plot
Misha the bear was chosen as the mascot of the Olympics, but Baba Yaga, together with the Serpent Gorynych and the "digger" Koshchei, seeks to prevent him from first getting to the Olympics, and then participating in it, but all their attempts end in failure. The character of Baba Yaga likely represents the United States, which led a boycott of the 1980 Olympics along with 66 other countries due to the Soviet war in Afghanistan. 

It was written by Aleksandr Kurlyandsky, Grigory Oster, and Eduard Uspensky.

References

External links
https://www.imdb.com/title/tt0448887/

Soviet animated films
1980 Summer Olympics
Soyuzmultfilm